Allah Darreh or Aleh Darreh or Aleh Derreh, also rendered as Hala Darreh and Haleh Darreh, may refer to:
 Allah Darreh-ye Olya
 Allah Darreh-ye Sofla